Appointment holder in government organisations of Pakistan refers to all those serving officials, whose services are accredited to the state and Government of Pakistan. Their recruitment and appointment in respective services are carried out as specified in the 1973 Constitution of Pakistan. No distinction based on gender, ethnic, racial, and sectarian factors is carried out in appointment and selection of appointees. Vacancies within each establishment for employment of official staff are legally sanctioned by the legislators and decision-making bodies. All organs of the state are organized in hierarchical order and officials serving therein are categorised in various fields as per the technical expertise entailed by each official post.

Pay scales of employees

Responsibilities and tasks pertaining to each official position vary with the type of organisation, in which appointees are working. Thus, various pay scales are determined in accordance with the nature of the job and by giving due consideration to the competitive environment. Each type of pay scale may vary with regard to amount paid to each official along with perks and privileges. But equivalence criteria within various types of pay scales has also been laid down, as stipulated in the following table.

Equivalence of Officials based on pay scales in Pakistan

Equivalence of Gazetted Officers based on pay scales in Pakistan

Gazetted Officers in Pakistan

Promotion opportunities
The Central Selection Board (CSB) of the Federal Public Service Commission is supposed to meet twice in a year to consider promotion opportunities for the appointed employees of Civil Service of Pakistan.

References

External links
PK JOBZ HUT
Federal Public Service Commission 2022
Federal Public Service Commission homepage
Civil Service of Pakistan

Pakistani government officials
Pakistani civil servants
Civil service of Pakistan